Party of Truth or Truth Party may refer to:

Albanian Path of Truth Party, a political party in Albania
Party of Truth (Yemen), a political party in Yemen
Sabah Truth Party, a political party in Malaysia